William Davenport (1772–1823) was an Irish academic. He was the eighth Erasmus Smith's Professor of Natural and Experimental Philosophy at Trinity College Dublin (TCD), serving in that role from 1807 to 1822.

Life and career
Davenport was born in Dublin, son of Edmund and Eliza Davenport of Capel Street, being baptized 14 October 1772. He matriculated at TCD 6 November 1787, aged 15. He was a Scholar in 1791 and received BA (1792), MA (1796) and DD (1808) from that institution. He was elected a Fellow in 1795, and served as Erasmus Smith's Professor of Natural and Experimental Philosophy (1807–1822). He was also appointed Archbishop King's Lecturer in Divinity in 1815. and was active in astronomical circles.

He spent the last two years of his life as a clergyman.

References

Sources
 Burtchaell, G. D., and Sadleir, T. U. (eds), Alumni Dublinensis: A Register of the Students, Graduates, Professors and Provosts of Trinity College in the University of Dublin, 1593–1860 (Dublin, 1935), page 212

Alumni of Trinity College Dublin
Academics of Trinity College Dublin
Fellows of Trinity College Dublin
Irish mathematicians
Scientists from Dublin (city)
1772 births
1823 deaths